Colin McRae Rally 04 is a racing video game developed and published by Codemasters for PlayStation 2, Xbox and Microsoft Windows.

Gameplay
There are six championships to complete in the game. There are 4 classes of cars: 4WD, 2WD, Group B and Bonus. The bonus class are cars that are not usually raced in rallies. These cars are only here for extra pleasure.  The game has rally tracks in 8 countries with a total of 52 stages.

Unlike in the previous three games, this game has no official WRC team license. All of the cars' liveries are either fictitious or taken from championships other than the WRC. Nicky Grist is replaced by Derek Ringer as the primary co-driver voice in the game, though Grist's voiceset is still accessible via game settings.

Reception

The game was met with positive reception; it has a score of 86% and 87 out of 100 for the PC version, 86% and 84 out of 100 for the Xbox version, and 85% and 83 out of 100 for the PlayStation 2 version according to GameRankings and Metacritic. It was nominated for GameSpots annual "Best Budget Game" award, which went to ESPN NFL 2K5.

References

External links
 

2003 video games
Codemasters games
Colin McRae Rally and Dirt series
Multiplayer and single-player video games
Split-screen multiplayer games
PlayStation 2 games
Racing simulators
Rally racing video games
Windows games
Xbox games
Video games set in Sweden
Video games set in Japan
Video games set in Finland
Video games set in Spain
Video games set in Australia
Video games set in Greece
Video games set in the United Kingdom
Video games set in the United States
Video games developed in the United Kingdom